The KG convoys were a series of Caribbean convoys which ran during the Battle of the Atlantic in World War II.

They take their name from the route:  Key West, Florida to Guantanamo, Cuba

Overview 
The KG series was the reverse of GK series that ran from 1 September 1942 until 6 May 1945. There were 168 "KG" convoys, comprising 1,345 individual ship listings. The escort ships for these convoys are not listed in the reference cited. Almost all ships listed in a convoy made the complete trip between Key West and Guantanamo.

The series started with KG 600 through KG 779 with 12 convoys cancelled. There are also no ships listed as being lost.

Convoy List

1942

1943

1944

1945

Notes 
Citations

Bibliography 

Books
 
 
 
Online resources

External links 
 Full listing of ships sailing in KG convoys

KG 0
Caribbean Sea operations of World War II